Chang Mi-hee (born January 27, 1958) is a South Korean actress. She was born Lee Yun-hui in Seoul, South Korea in 1958. Chang debuted as an actress in 1976 as starring in Seong Chun-hyang jeon directed by Park Tae-won and TBC TV drama, Haenyeo Dang-sil (Sea Woman Dang-sil). Chang was commonly referred to as "New Troika" or "Second Troika" along with her rival actresses, Jeong Yun-hui and Yu Ji-in of the 1970s and 1980s after the "First Troika", Moon Hee, Nam Jeong-im, and Yoon Jeong-hee of the 1960s.

Filmography

Film
*Note; the whole list is referenced.

Television series
This list is incomplete

Awards
 1980, the 1st, the Korean Film Critics Awards : Best Actress for Neumi
 1981, the 17th, Baeksang Arts Awards : Best TV Actress for Eulhwa (KBS, 을화))
 1983, the 22nd, Grand Bell Awards : Best Actress for Jeokdo-ui kkot (적도의 꽃))
 1990, the 26th, Baeksang Arts Awards : Best TV Actress for Nation of Fire (불의 나라)
 1991, the 12th, Blue Dragon Film Awards : Best Actress for Death Song (사의 찬미)
 1991, the 2nd, Chunsa Film Art Awards : Best Actress for Death Song
 1992, the 16th, Gold Cinematography Awards : Special Award, Favorite Actress
 1992, the 30th, Grand Bell Awards : Best Actress for Death Song
 2008, KBS Drama Awards, Popularity Award for Mom's Dead Upset
 2008, KBS Drama Awards, Best Couple Award with Kim Yong-gun for Mom's Dead Upset
2018 KBS Drama Awards: Top Excellence Award, Actress, Best Couple

References

External links

1958 births
20th-century South Korean actresses
21st-century South Korean actresses
South Korean film actresses
South Korean television actresses
Actresses from Seoul
Living people
Best Actress Paeksang Arts Award (film) winners
Best Actress Paeksang Arts Award (television) winners